The Tunnel Under the World (original Italian title Il tunnel sotto il mondo) is a 1969 low-budget Italian science-fiction film directed and edited by Luigi Cozzi inspired by Frederik Pohl's novella of the same name. The screenplay was written by Tito Monego and Alfredo Castelli, best known as the creator of the comic book series Martin Mystère.

It was the directorial debut of a 21-year-old Luigi Cozzi. It began as a film school project and eventually wound up becoming a full-length feature film. Cozzi's work on this film brought him to the attention of famed horror film director Dario Argento and jump-started his career.

Cast
 Alberto Moro
 Bruno Salviero
 Anna Mantovani
 Lello Maraniello
 Gretel Fehr
 Isabel Karalson
 Pietro Rosati
 Ivana Monti
 Luigi Cozzi

Reception
It was shown at the Trieste Festival Internazionale del Film di Fantascienza in 1969. Apparently it is not available on dvd.

References

External links
 Tunnel Under the World  at the Internet Movie Database

1969 films
1960s science fiction films
Italian science fiction films
1960s Italian-language films
Films based on science fiction works
Films directed by Luigi Cozzi
1960s Italian films